Alternatives: Turkish Journal of International Relations is an open access peer-reviewed academic journal covering international relations and political science.

External links
 

International relations journals